Ikaw na Sana (International title: Destiny / ) is a Philippine television drama romance series broadcast by GMA Network. Directed by Mac Alejandre, it stars Angelu de Leon and Bobby Andrews. It premiered on March 17, 1997. The series concluded on April 3, 1998 with a total of 272 episodes.

The series was later adapted into a film of the same title.

Cast and characters

Lead cast
 Angelu de Leon as Blanca Rosales Perez / Susan Saavedra
 Bobby Andrews as Rafael Huico

Supporting cast
 Gladys Reyes as Angela Rosales
 Carmi Martin as Barbara Rosales Juico
 Cherry Pie Picache as Corazon Rosales-Perez
 Jake Roxas as Emil
 Isabel Granada as Lucila Rosales
 Jeffrey Santos as Eric de Saavedra 
 Alicia Mayer as Gia 
 Aura Mijares as Impong Isidra
 Julio Diaz as Gardo Perez
 Nonie Buencamino as Gardo
 Chubi del Rosario as Billy
 Blue de Leon as Benjamin Saavedra
 Anne Curtis as Jasmine
 Melise "Mumay" Santiago as Nina

References

External links
 

1997 Philippine television series debuts
1998 Philippine television series endings
Filipino-language television shows
GMA Network drama series
Philippine romance television series
Television series by Viva Television
Television shows set in the Philippines